

239001–239100 

|-id=046
| 239046 Judysyd ||  || Judith J. Levine (born 1937) and Sydney P. Levine (born 1933), orthopedic surgeon and maritime economic consultant respectively, supported and nurtured the creative and scientific aspirations of their children, one of whom discovered this asteroid. || 
|-id=071
| 239071 Penghu || 2006 GF || The Taiwanese archipelago of Penghu, the country's only island county consisting of 64 small islands || 
|}

239101–239200 

|-id=105
| 239105 Marcocattaneo ||  || Marco Cattaneo (born 1963), a science journalist and director of the Italian edition of Scientific American. || 
|-id=200
| 239200 Luoyang ||  || Luoyang, an ancient city situated on the central plain of China. || 
|}

239201–239300 

|-id=203
| 239203 Simeon ||  || Simeon I of Bulgaria (864–927), who ruled over Bulgaria from 893 to 927. || 
|-id=282
| 239282 Kevinmccarron ||  || Kevin McCarron (born 1959) is a retired high school astronomy & physics teacher at Oak Park and River Forest, Illinois, as well as an educator at Yerkes Observatory. He advances initiatives for diversity in STEM opportunities for people of color, females, the deaf and hard of hearing, as well as youth who are blind or deafblind. || 
|}

239301–239400 

|-id=307
| 239307 Kruchynenko ||  || Vitaliy Grygorovych Kruchynenko (born 1934), professor of physics and mathematics and researcher on meteors and comets || 
|}

239401–239500 

|-bgcolor=#f2f2f2
| colspan=4 align=center | 
|}

239501–239600 

|-id=593
| 239593 Tianwenbang ||  || Tianwenbang, an alliance of the astronomy clubs of several senior high schools in Kaohsiung, Taiwan || 
|}

239601–239700 

|-id=611
| 239611 Likwohting ||  || Kwoh-Ting Li (born 1911) was trained as a physicist but became the mastermind of Taiwan's industrial revolution and economic miracle between 1960 and 1990. || 
|-id=645
| 239645 Shandongas ||  || ShandongAS is the abbreviation of Shandong Astronomical Society (SAS). Shandong province is the origin of astronomical education and scientific research in modern China. SAS is a new organization founded in 2021. Its mission is to serve astronomers, astronomical educators and amateurs and promote the development of astronomy. || 
|-id=672
| 239672 SOFIA ||  || The Stratospheric Observatory for Infrared Astronomy (SOFIA) is a joint German-US air-borne observatory. With its 2.5-meter telescope on board a Boeing 747SP aircraft, it allows infrared and sub-millimeter observations from above earth's troposphere, leaving most of the atmospheric water vapor below. || 
|-id=675
| 239675 Mottez ||  || Fabrice Mottez (born 1963), a French astrophysicist at the Paris Observatory || 
|}

239701–239800 

|-id=716
| 239716 Felixbaumgartner ||  || Felix Baumgartner (born 1969), an Austrian skydiver, extreme athlete and BASE jumper || 
|-id=792
| 239792 Hankakováčová ||  || Hanka Kovácová (born 1986), a director and dramaturgist. || 
|}

239801–239900 

|-id=890
| 239890 Edudeldon ||  || Eduardo Delgado Donate (1977–2007), an astrophysicist who mainly studied the formation of multiple-star and brown-dwarf systems. || 
|}

239901–240000 

|-bgcolor=#f2f2f2
| colspan=4 align=center | 
|}

References 

239001-240000